Islam vs. Islamists: Voices from the Muslim Center was a documentary produced for PBS's series America at a Crossroads. When the Corporation for Public Broadcasting refused to air the documentary unless producer Martyn Burke made certain changes, Burke accused the organization of not wanting to air it for political reasons. Burke objected to pressure from one of PBS's executives, who argued that the moderates portrayed in the film should not be considered true Muslims.
 
PBS argued, in response, that there was not enough room to air this particular documentary as part of the series, citing there were only 11 hours of airtime with 21 approved film projects. The Corporation for Public Broadcasting replied that the 'film simply needs work but stands a chance to be aired eventually as a "stand-alone" program in the future.' CPB representative Michael Leavy said the film violated PBS standards and the grant agreement, but did not describe how the film fell short of the standards, stating that CPB is responsible only for funding programs, not their content. PBS executives reportedly sent notes to the producers, saying the film would 'demonize Islam'. On April 25, 2007, Islam vs. Islamists was reviewed by members of Congress, sponsored by Senators Joe Lieberman and James Inhofe and Representatives Trent Franks and Brad Sherman. A day later, Franks drafted a letter urging PBS to air the documentary.

The episode was ultimately picked up by Fox News Channel, who promoted it as Banned by PBS: Muslims Against Jihad. The unedited documentary, along with interviews with the producers, was aired on July 7, 2007. Later, it was distributed by the Portland PBS affiliate (Oregon Public Broadcasting) and aired on most PBS stations across the country.

See also
America at a Crossroads, the series for which it was originally produced, which included several other segments about Islam
God's Warriors, a three-part miniseries by CNN examining extremism in Christianity, Judaism and Islam

References

External links
C-SPAN Q&A interview with Frank Gaffney about Islam vs. Islamists, June 3, 2007

2007 documentary films
2007 television films
2007 films
Documentary films about Islam in the United States
Fox News original programming
Public Broadcasting Service
2007 in American television